Rehanne Skinner is an English football manager who was most recently the head coach of FA Women's Super League club Tottenham Hotspur.

Coaching career

Early coaching career 
Earlier in her career, Skinner worked with Leicester City, starting as a U9 boys coach and rising through the ranks as Women's First Team Manager in 2006, Arsenal as Ladies First Team Assistant Manager, and British Universities and Colleges Sport. She worked in the United States at Florida's Massive Soccer, coaching with the Massive Soccer Academy, PBG Predators, and FC Florida.  On 4 May 2016 Skinner was announced as an assistant manager for the Wales women's national team, as well as roles with the U19 and U17 national teams.

England national teams 
In September 2017, just over a year after taking on her coaching roles with Wales, she began her time with the England women's national team program as the U19 head coach. Qualifying for the 2018 UEFA Women's Under-19 Championship began just a month later, and Skinner would lead England through a perfect group stage in the qualifying round, with three wins and no losses. The Elite round of qualifying took place in April 2018 and saw England miss out on qualifying for the tournament in their final group stage match, losing to Germany who then finished three points ahead in their group.

The following year she led England to a perfect qualifying record for the 2019 tournament, with three wins out of three matches in the Elite round of qualification. England did not fair as well in the final tournament, losing two matches and winning just one in group play. Skinner would not be given the opportunity to attempt to qualify for the 2020 tournament as the Elite qualifying round in which England would feature was cancelled due to the developing COVID-19 pandemic in Europe.

Her role with the England national teams evolved over time, and eventually she became the England women’s national head coach, leading squads in the whole of the U18-U21s range. She was appointed the assistant coach of the England women's national football team under head coach Phil Neville starting in September 2020 through his scheduled departure in summer 2021. Skinner's stint with the senior team would end far earlier than initially planned, with her leaving her position in November 2020.

Tottenham Hotspur 
On 19 November 2020, Skinner was appointed as the new head coach of Tottenham Hotspur, replacing long time managers Karen Hills and Juan Carlos Amorós. Spurs were in 11th place, just one spot above last place and relegation, having secured only three points from three draws in seven league matches. On 6 December 2020 in her first match in charge, Skinner led the club to their first win of the 2020–21 FA WSL season with a 3-1 victory over Brighton & Hove Albion. Spurs would finish the season in 8th place, well clear of relegation and just a place under where the club finished in their first WSL campaign the previous season. 

Skinner's first full season in charge of Spurs would see the team reach new heights. Spurs' second match of the 2021–22 season on 12 September saw them beat Manchester City for the first time in team history. The defeat was City's first at home in the WSL since April 2018. This was Spurs' first win against a member of the "top four" sides of Arsenal, Chelsea, and Manchester United. That November Spurs would take their first ever point from Manchester United and Arsenal after drawing 1–1 against both sides in consecutive matches.  Skinner led Spurs out of the group stage of the League Cup for the first time. Spurs would beat Liverpool in the quarter-finals to advance to their first ever semi-final in any major cup competition, but would bow out of the competition after a loss to eventual champions Manchester City. Spurs would end the season in fifth place, their highest ever finish in the WSL. Skinner would earn a nomination for WSL Manager of the Season, a first for a Tottenham manager.

On 13 March 2023, Skinner was sacked after a run of nine straight league defeats which left the club third bottom in the league.

References

External links
 
 

Living people
English women's football managers
Women's Super League managers
Year of birth missing (living people)